Haminoea hydatis is a species of sea snail or bubble snail, a marine opisthobranch gastropod mollusc in the family Haminoeidae, one of the families of bubble snails.

Description

It is a fragile, inflated, oblong shell partially hidden by the mantle and parapodial lobes in crawling animals. These herbivorous swimming snails are dark brown.

Distribution and habitat
This species is present in SW Britain, Ireland, France and south to the Mediterranean, Madeira and Canaries; Ascension Island, St. Helena and west coast of Africa. These snails live on muddy sands, shell grit and algae fields.

References
 Gofas, S.; Le Renard, J.; Bouchet, P. (2001). Mollusca, in: Costello, M.J. et al. (Ed.) (2001). European register of marine species: a check-list of the marine species in Europe and a bibliography of guides to their identification. Collection Patrimoines Naturels, 50: pp. 180–213

External links
WoRMS

EoL
PESI
Sea Slug Forum

hydatis
Gastropods described in 1758
Taxa named by Carl Linnaeus